Doguindi is a sub-prefecture of Logone Occidental Region in Chad.

References 

Populated places in Chad